Arisaig  is a village in Lochaber, Inverness-shire. Arisaig is also the traditional name for part of the surrounding peninsula south of Loch Morar, extending east to Moidart. Etymologically, Arisaig means "safe bay". It lies in the Scottish council area of Highland and has a population of about 300.

Prehistory
Realignment of a 6 km section of the A830 road in Arisaig led to archaeological investigations in 2000–2001 by the Centre for Field Archaeology (CFA), the University of Edinburgh, and Headland Archaeology Ltd, which found a Bronze Age kerb cairn, turf buildings and shieling huts. The shielings were repeatedly reused through the medieval and post-medieval periods, but themselves were on top of Bronze Age remains.

Analysis of peat cores has revealed a history of continuous, but gradual decline in woodland, starting in about 3200 BC and continuing to the present. The same analysis found that people were likely to have been in the area constantly from 2500 BC, but in low numbers. From 500 BC onwards the area underwent more intensive grazing activities.

Further improvements to the A830, led to excavations, again by CFA, in 2005 of a burnt mound, the first such feature to have been excavated in this part of the Highlands. The mound was radiocarbon dated to period from 2550 to 1900 BC, the early Bronze Age. The purpose of burnt mounds are unknown and they have been hypothesized to have been used as cooking  places, saunas or breweries and, unfortunately, the Arisiag burnt mound did not provide an answer to the question of their purpose(s).

History

Early history

After raids by Vikings that had begun in the 8th century AD, Arisaig became part of the Kingdom of the Isles, a Norwegian dependency. In the late 11th century, however, Malcolm III of Scotland came to a written agreement with Magnus Barelegs, the Norwegian king, to move the border to the coast, so that Arisaig became Scottish.

In the early 12th century, Somerled, a Norse-Gael of uncertain origin, became owner of Arisaig and the surrounding region. No reliable record explains how this happened, but by some point in the 1140s, David I of Scotland's control of the region had been eroded. In the middle of that century, Somerled launched a coup in the Kingdom of the Isles, which led to it joining his other possessions as a single state. On Somerled's death, Norwegian authority was restored, but in practice it remained divided; the part containing Arisaig was known as Garmoran and ruled by the MacRory, a faction among Somerled's heirs.

After the 1266 Treaty of Perth, Garmoran became a Scottish crown dependency – the Lordship of Garmoran – still ruled by the MacRory, until the final MacRory heir was Amy of Garmoran. Most of the remainder of the kingdom had become the Lordship of the Isles, ruled by the MacDonalds, whose leader, John of Islay, married Amy. After the birth of three sons, he divorced Amy and married the king's niece, in return for a substantial dowry. As part of the arrangement, John deprived his eldest son, Ranald, of the right to inherit the Lordship of the Isles, in favour of a son by his new wife. As compensation, he made Ranald the Lord of Garmoran.

However, Ranald's sons were still children at the end of the 14th century, and his younger brother Godfrey seized the Lordship of Garmoran in their stead. Furthermore, the heirs of Ranald's other brother Murdoch now made their own claim. This led to much violent conflict involving Godfrey's family (the Siol Gorrie) and those of his brothers, although this is not described in much detail in surviving records.

By 1427, King James I was frustrated with the general level of violence in the Highlands, together with an insurrection caused by his own cousin. He demanded that Highland magnates attend a meeting at Inverness. On arrival, many were seized and imprisoned. Alexander MacGorrie, son of Godfrey, was considered one of the two most reprehensible, and after a quick show trial immediately executed. Alexander had by then inherited Godfrey's de facto position as Lord of Garmoran, and in view of Ranald's heirs being no less responsible for the violence, King James declared the Lordship forfeit.

Lairdship grants

In 1469, James' grandson (James III) granted Lairdship of the lands of Garmoran and Uist to John of Ross, the Lord of the Isles. In turn, John passed it to his half-brother, Hugh of Sleat; the grant to Hugh was confirmed by the king in a 1493 charter. The violence that led to Alexander's execution had brought the Siol Gorrie to the brink of extinction, and after Alexander's death they played no further part in Arisaig's history.

Ranald's heirs, Clan Ranald, disputed and fought against the charter. After Hugh of Sleat's death in 1498, and for reasons that are not remotely clear, his son John of Sleat immediately resigned, transferring all authority to the king. By this time John of Ross's conspiratorial ambition had caused the Lordship of the Isles to be forfeited, but in 1501, his heir, Black Donald, launched an insurrection aimed at restoring it. Ranald Bane, leader of Clan Ranald, was one of the few MacDonald-descended clan leaders to refuse to support Donald, and so in 1505, shortly before Donald was defeated, Ranald Bane was given the Lairdship of Arisaig and Eigg as a reward.

In 1520, the excessive cruelty of Ranald Bane's son, Dougall (not described in detail by surviving records) led to his assassination and the exclusion of Ranald Bane's descendants from leadership of Clan Ranald. Instead, Ranald Bane's brother, Alexander, took over the leadership. In 1532, the king provided a charter confirming Alexander's son, John Moidartach, as Laird of Arisaig and Eigg.

Later history
On 20 September 1746 Bonnie Prince Charlie left Scotland for France from a place near the village after the collapse of the Jacobite rising of 1745. The site of his departure is marked by the Prince's Cairn at Loch nan Uamh, to the east of Arisaig. A few decades later, many of the local population left as well, emigrating to Canada, where in 1785 they founded Arisaig, Nova Scotia.

Ranald George, the 20th chief of Clan Ranald ran into financial difficulty sold almost all the traditional Clan Ranald lands, including Arisaig, in the 1820s. Some Archaeological excavations of a croft by CFA Archaeology, during the realignment and upgrading works of the A830 in 2005, and historical research by Stirling University found that the new landowner, Lord Cranstoun was the most notable estate owner during the difficult times of Arisaig, mainly for his cruel actions. Lord Cranstoun was arguably the main perpetrator for the largest amount of clearances occurring within Arisaig during the famine years. During the famine, Lord Cranstoun was certainly not a popular proprietor, he was seen as a landlord who failed to make effort to bring relief to his tenants, and even provide work during times of destitution 
It was even noted within a debate in the House of Commons in 1847, that Lord Cranstoun had 17 servants on the edge of starvation, who he refused to pay or provide for (see Distress in Scotland, HC Deb, 22 February 1847, vol 90, cc310 - 6). Ellice (1847, see previous reference), noted that the state of most families in Arisaig during the time, were on the brink of starvation and destitution. Lord Cranstoun, alongside other estate owners, were encouraged to offer road expansions or drain improvements on their estates, giving destitute families a chance to work, which he begrudgingly accepted, however, refused to provide tools for the job. The economic downturn and potato blight caused estate owners to focus their attention towards pasture lands for sheep and deer hunting grounds, predominantly for the very wealthy, causing many people to be evicted or emigrate, with the unoccupied houses falling into ruin in and around Arisaig.

The house was largely destroyed by fire in 1935 and remodelled in 1937 for Charlotte Gertrude Astley-Nicholson (died 1961).

In the Second World War, Arisaig House became the headquarters for the Scottish section of the Special Operations Executive, which ran paramilitary training courses in the surrounding area, preparing agents for missions in Occupied Europe. The remoteness of the rough bounds made it an ideal site for this. On 11 November 2009 a memorial to Czechoslovak soldiers who had trained as SOE agents in 1943–1945 was unveiled in Arisaig.

Famous resident
Alasdair Mac Mhaighstir Alasdair, the leading war poet of the Jacobite rising of 1745 and teacher of Scottish Gaelic language to Prince Charles Edward Stuart, died while serving as tacksman of Arisaig in 1770 and was buried in the cemetery of Kilmorie, close to the present Catholic church of Arisaig. Although the exact location of the Bard's grave is no longer known, a wall plaque was erected in 1927 in St. Mary's Roman Catholic cemetery in Arisaig "by a few Jacobite admirers in New Zealand and some fellow clansmen at home, in recognition of his greatness as a Gaelic poet". The Clanranald Bard, as he is sometimes called, remains, along with 20th century Raasay Bard Sorley MacLean, one of the two most important writers in the history of Scottish Gaelic literature.

Amenities and attractions

Arisaig has a post office, a general store, a restaurant, a cafe, a hotel with a bar, and a marina. Tourism is the main industry in the area.

The Land, Sea and Islands Centre offers a display on the connection between the Special Operations Executive and Arisaig. See above.

Transport
Arisaig lies on the A830 to Mallaig to the north and Fort William to the east. It is also known as the Road to the Isles. Work on widening it into a double-lane road was completed in 2008. The village is also connected to Mallaig and Fort William by the West Highland Line. Arisaig railway station is the most westerly on the British mainland.

A small passenger ferry sails from Arisaig to the Small Isles of Eigg, Muck and Rùm. The main CalMac service to the Small Isles operates from Mallaig.

Cultural references
Several areas of England have Arisaig as a street name, such as Ouston, County Durham. A fictionalized Ardnish peninsula and Arisaig provide the setting for most of the "Ian and Sovra" series of children's novels by Elinor Lyon.

References

External links

Road to the Isles information page on Arisaig
Panorama of the Sound of Arisaig (QuickTime required)
Sunday Mail, September 2009, reporting on moorings grab controversy
Findagrave for Alasdair mac Mhaighstir Alasdair

Populated places in Lochaber
Elinor Lyon